(born 1960) is a Japanese conductor.  He is currently music director of the Brussels Philharmonic and of the Tokyo Metropolitan Symphony Orchestra, and artistic director of New National Theatre Tokyo.

Biography
Ōno studied at the Tokyo National University of Fine Arts and Music, and with Wolfgang Sawallisch and Giuseppe Patanè at the Bavarian State Opera, as a scholar of the Japanese Ministry of Culture. In 1987, he won First Prize in the 3rd Toscanini International Conductors' Competition.

Ōno was principal conductor of the Tokyo Philharmonic Orchestra from 1992 to 1999, and its artistic advisor from 1999 to 2001.  He currently holds the title of Conductor Laureate with the orchestra.

In May 2013, the Tokyo Metropolitan Symphony Orchestra announced the appointment of Ōno as its music director, as of April 2015, with an initial contract of 5 years. In 2018, his contract was extended through March 2023.  In October 2021, the orchestra further extended his contract through 2026.

Career in Europe
In Europe, Ōno was Chief Conductor of the Zagreb Philharmonic Orchestra from 1990 to 1996. He was General Music Director of the Baden State Opera, Karlsruhe from 1996 to 2002.  In August 2002, he became music director of La Monnaie (Brussels), after his debut there in March 2001, conducting Salvatore Sciarrino's chamber opera Luci mie traditrici. Other contemporary operas that Ōno conducted with La Monnaie included Philippe Boesmans' Julie and Wintermärchen, and the world premiere of Toshio Hosokawa's Hanjo at the Aix-en-Provence Festival (2004).  Ōno stepped down as music director at La Monnaie at the end of the 2007–2008 season.  Ōno became principal conductor of the Opéra National de Lyon at the start of the 2008–2009 season, with an initial contract of 5 years.  He concluded his tenure at Opéra National de Lyon at the close of the 2016–2017 season.

In January 2014, the Barcelona Symphony and Catalonia National Orchestra (OBC) announced the appointment of Ōno as its next music director, effective September 2015, with an initial contract of 3 years, which has since been extended until the end of the 2021–2022 season.  Ōno concluded his OBC tenure at the close of the 2021–2022 season.

Ōno was appointed artistic director of the New National Theatre Tokyo (NNTT) from the 2018 season.  His contract has since been extended until the 2025–2026 season. His first productions included the world premiere of Asters in 2019, commissioned from Japanese composer Akira Nishimura, which was nominated for a 2020 International Opera Award.  Subsequent NNTT world premieres include Dai Fujikura' A Dream of Armageddon (2020) and Keiichiro Shibuya's Android opera Super Angels (2021).

Other new works Ōno has commissioned include Mark-Anthony Turnage's Hibiki, which premiered at Suntory Hall in November 2016 before featuring at the 2017 BBC Proms and which won the 2018 Royal Philharmonic Society award for Large-Scale Composition.

In 2021, Ōno first guest-conducted the Brussels Philharmonic.  In September 2021, the Brussels Philharmonic announced the appointment of Ōno as its next music director, effective with the 2022–2023 season.

Awards
Ōno is the recipient of the 2009 Suntory Music Award and the 2015 Asahi Prize. He was also awarded Officier de l’ordre des Arts et des Lettres by French cultural minister Françoise Nyssen for his contribution to Japanese society.

References

External links
Official website of Kazushi Ono
Maestro Arts agency profile on Kazushi Ono 
Profile on his Japanese management agent AMATI
Interview on MusicalCriticism.com, October 2008
Biography from NEC

21st-century conductors (music)
Japanese conductors (music)
Japanese male conductors (music)
Living people
Music directors (opera)
Recipients of the Medal with Purple Ribbon
1960 births